The following is a list of South Alabama Jaguars football seasons for the football team that has represented the University of South Alabama in NCAA competition.

Season-by-season records

References

South Alabama

South Alabama Jaguars football seasons